Vladislav Otmakhov (born May 29, 1974) is a Russian former professional ice hockey defenceman. He played for Dinamo-Energija Yekaterinburg, CSK VVS Samara, Molot-Prikamye Perm, Torpedo Nizhny Novgorod and Avtomobilist Yekaterinburg.

Career statistics

References

External links

1974 births
Living people
Avtomobilist Yekaterinburg players
HC CSK VVS Samara players
Molot-Prikamye Perm players
Russian ice hockey defencemen 
Sportspeople from Yekaterinburg
Sputnik Nizhny Tagil players
Torpedo Nizhny Novgorod players